The Department of Chemical Engineering and Biotechnology (CEB) is one of the teaching and research departments at the University of Cambridge. The department trains undergraduate students and conducts original research at the interfaces between engineering, chemistry, biology and physics. It conducts research in collaboration with industrial partners. Its research programmes encompass sustainable reaction engineering, chemical product and process design, healthcare, measurement, and materials science. It conducts biotechnology research with chemical engineering at the science-engineering interface.

Notable staff
 notable staff include
 Sabine Bahn
 John Bridgwater
 Silvana Cardoso
 Howard Chase
 Lynn Gladden
 Elizabeth A. H. Hall
 Ross D. King
 Róisín Owens

Heads of department 
These include heads of the former Department of Chemical Engineering and Institute of Biotechnology which merged to form the current department.

 Lisa Hall
 John Dennis
 Lynn Gladden 
 John Davidson
 Peter Danckwerts

Alumni
Former staff include:
 Francis Thomas Bacon

History

In 1945, the university received an endowment from Shell for a chemical engineering department and chair. The first Shell Professor was Terence Fox, appointed in 1946. The undergraduate Tripos course began in 1948. Peter Danckwerts was head of department from 1959 to 1975 and then John Davidson became Shell Professor and Head of department in 1975. He held the post until 1993 when he retired.

in 2008, the Department of Chemical Engineering merged with the Institute of Biotechnology to become the Department of Chemical Engineering and Biotechnology.

Until 2017, the department's main centre of activity was the Shell building on Pembroke Street on the New Museums Site, to the south of Cambridge city centre. In 2017, the department moved over to a new building on Philippa Fawcett Drive on the West Cambridge site.

The building was officially opened by the chancellor of the university, David Sainsbury, Baron Sainsbury of Turville, on 24 April 2018.

References

Biology education in the United Kingdom
Biotechnology in the United Kingdom
Chemical Engineering and Biotechnology, Department of
Engineering universities and colleges in the United Kingdom
Chemical Engineering and Biotechnology, Department of